Sir Richard Peter Pease, 4th Baronet (born September 1958) is a British fund manager, who manages the TM Crux European and TM Crux European Special Situations funds for Crux Asset Management, which he founded in 2014.

Early life
Pease was born in September 1958. He is the only son of Sir Richard Pease, 3rd Baronet, and his wife, Anne Heyworth, and is the 4th baronet of the baronetcy. He was educated at Eton, followed by a bachelor's degree from Durham University. During his time at Durham, Pease was a member of Hatfield College.

Career
He was head of European equities at Jupiter Asset Management, before joining Henderson Global Investors, where he was director of European equities.

In February 2016, it was reported that Pease was suing his former employer Henderson Global Investors for £2.7 million in respect of unpaid income for the 2012 to 2014 period.

In his investment approach, Pease has been called the "European equivalent to Neil Woodford".

Personal life
He is married to Victoria "Vita" Pease (maiden name also Pease), who was born in Brazil the daughter of an economics professor father. In 2016, she published her first novel, Playing FTSE under the pen-name Penelope Jacobs.  They live in Kensington, London, and have two sons and a daughter, and two older sons from Pease's first marriage.

Pease bought the 10-bedroom 17th-century Newland House in Newland, Gloucestershire, in 2011, and was renovating it, when it was "completely gutted" by fire in April 2012.

References

1958 births
Living people
People educated at Eton College
Richard
Alumni of Hatfield College, Durham
Baronets in the Baronetage of the United Kingdom